John P. Hughey (1836 – January 28, 1900) was a Union Army soldier in the American Civil War who received the U.S. military's highest decoration, the Medal of Honor.

Hughey was born in Louisville, Kentucky in 1836 and entered service in Anna, Illinois. He was awarded the Medal of Honor, for extraordinary heroism shown on April 6, 1865, while serving as a Corporal with Company E, 67th Pennsylvania Infantry, at the Battle of Sayler's Creek, in Virginia. Hughey won his medal for capturing the battle flag of the Confederate States Army's 38th Virginia Infantry. His Medal of Honor was issued on May 3, 1865. He died in Fulton County, Kentucky in 1900.

Medal of Honor citation

External links

References

American Civil War recipients of the Medal of Honor
Military personnel from Louisville, Kentucky
People of Kentucky in the American Civil War
Union Army officers
United States Army Medal of Honor recipients
1836 births
1900 deaths